Takis Lemonis (born 13 January 1960) is a Greek professional football manager and former player.

Playing career
Takis Lemonis played for local club Attikos before playing for Olympiakos from 1978 until 1987. He also played for Levadiakos (1987 – 1991) and Ιonikos 1992, Panionios (1992 – 1993), finishing his career in Ethnikos at 1994. During his playing career, Lemonis was capped twice by the Greece national football team.

Coaching career
Having stopped football as a player, Lemonis studied coaching in England and, in 1996, became head coach at Asteras Zografou. In 2000, he returned to Olympiacos as the assistant coach and, after the dismissal of Giannis Matzourakis, as head coach. Lemonis had domestic success at Olympiakos by winning two championships in a row. He left the team in October 2002. He has since coached APOEL F.C. in Cyprus (2003), Kallithea FC (2005) and Levadiakos upon their return to the Alpha Ethniki for the 2006 season.

Olympiacos under the leading of Takis Lemonis won the championship with 12 points difference in 2001 and beat AEK in a match practically final of the championship with a 4–3 in an impressive match in April 2002. He also won AEK 6–1 and Panathinaikos 1–4 in Leoforos, Panathinaikos' historical castle, which together with this season's 4–0 against Panathinaicos again are the biggest domestic victories a Greek team has ever achieved during the last 20 years. Those victories gave him the nickname sir takis.

In September 2006, Lemonis once again replaced Ioannis Matzourakis, this time as coach of Xanthi FC. He resigned in December 2006 and, later that month, signed a six months contract and replaced Trond Sollied as the head coach of Olympiakos.

Although Olympiacos was eventually crowned champion, the loss of the derby of the eternal enemies, the disqualification by a lower division club in the Greek Cup and the loss of Rivaldo led Olympiacos fans to boo Lemonis, Sokratis Kokkalis (the chairman of the club) and the players. However, the chairman decided to extend Lemonis's contract for two more years which keeps Lemonis in the club until summer 2009. The 2007–08 season started badly with Olympiacos losing points in the Greek Superleague and drawing with Lazio at home. The away match with Werder Bremen was critical for Lemonis. However, Olympiacos prevailed 1–3 (his first win in an away Champions League match) and Lemonis was given an extension. Lemonis was doing better on his second spell with Olympiacos, leading the way to a second away victory in Champions League away game against SS Lazio, a home win of 3–0 against Bremen (6–1 tally in favor of Olympiakos between the two teams), and a dominant 4–0 win against Panathinaikos in the Greek Cup eighth-finals.

As coach of Olympiacos, Lemonis has achieved a great amount in both their domestic and UEFA Champions League campaigns. He achieved Olympiacos' greatest margin of victory in the competition by defeating Bayer Leverkusen 6–2 in 2002–03. In his second reign as coach, Lemonis gave Olympiacos their first away win in the competition against SV Werder Bremen, and a trip to the Round of 16 for only the second time in their history in 2007–08.

On 12 November 2008, Lemonis signed a contract for rest of the 2008–09 season and replaced Ewald Lienen as the head coach of Panionios. He finally resigned on 3 December 2008 after the refuse of the Panionio's board to accept his request to dismiss three members of Panionio's coaching and management staff.

On 17 March 2009, he signed a two-year contract with Omonia. In 2010, Lemonis led Omonoia to its 20th Championship. He returned to Greece coaching Levadiakos, Panetolikos and Panionios.

On 23 March 2017, Lemonis returned to Olympiacos for a third managerial stint, signing a contract until the end of the season. He won his fifth championship with Olympiacos.

On 25 September 2017, Lemonis returned to Olympiacos for a fourth managerial stint, after Besnik Hasi was released from Olympiacos. Despite being credited with conducting the team from 5th place to the lead in the Superleague league table before Christmas, he was relieved of his duties on 4 January 2018, while being offered the opportunity to remain at the club through an alternative staff role; alleged reasons for his dismissal were his difficulties in handling the dressing room and employing well-defined tactical plans, as well as his passive Champions League mentality with an objective of not recording heavy losses rather than being competitive against stronger opposition.

Managerial statistics

Honours

Player
Olympiacos
Greek Championship: 1980, 1981, 1982, 1987
Greek Cup: 1981

Manager
Olympiacos
Greek Championship: 2001, 2002, 2007, 2017
Greek Cup: Runner-up: 2001, 2002
Greek Super Cup: 2007

Omonia
Cypriot Championship: 2010
Cyprus FA Shield: 2010

References

1960 births
Living people
Footballers from Athens
Greek footballers
Association football midfielders
Greek football managers
Olympiacos F.C. players
Levadiakos F.C. players
Greece international footballers
Greek expatriates in Cyprus
Expatriate football managers in Cyprus
Olympiacos F.C. managers
AC Omonia managers
Super League Greece players
Super League Greece managers
Panionios F.C. players
Panionios F.C. managers
APOEL FC managers
Xanthi F.C. managers
Panetolikos F.C. managers
Al-Raed FC managers
Greek expatriate football managers